Talab Darreh (also Romanized as Talāb Darreh) is a village in Shanderman Rural District, Shanderman District, Masal County, Gilan Province, Iran. At the 2006 census, its population was 323, in 70 families.

References 

Populated places in Masal County